Kingsbury Oil Terminal is an oil storage depot located to the northeast of the village of Kingsbury, Warwickshire, England.  It was opened in the late 1960s and serves the Midlands region.  It is the largest inland oil storage depot in the United Kingdom. The main operators at the site are Essar, Warwickshire Oil Storage Limited and Valero Energy Corporation. The site also has facilities from Shell and pipeline operations from the British Pipeline Agency.

In August 2006 the terminal was targeted by terrorists as part of a terror plot involving several sites across the country.

Protests 
During a period of protest by Just Stop Oil and Extinction Rebellion starting 1 April, more than 100 climate activists, ages ranging between 25 and 71, were arrested.

On 14 September 2022, 51 Just Stop Oil protesters were arrested for breach of court order after blocking the entrance to the Kingsbury Oil Terminal.

References

External links 
Oil fuel distributors in Warwickshire

Oil terminals
Petroleum infrastructure in the United Kingdom
Buildings and structures in Warwickshire
Kingsbury, Warwickshire
BP buildings and structures